Giuseppe Miccolis (born 6 April 1973) is an Italian football midfielder who  plays for GC Biaschesi.

Career 
On 18 February 2009 the Swiss midfielder left AC Bellinzona of the Swiss Super League and joined GC Biaschesi.

References

1973 births
Living people
Italian footballers
FC Locarno players
FC Winterthur players
AC Bellinzona players
FC Baden players
FC Lugano players
Association football midfielders